Jānis Strupulis (monogram JS, born 28 January 1949) is a Latvian sculptor and graphical designer, who designed some of the modern Latvian coins with denominations in Latvian lats.

Life 
Strupulis was born 28 January 1949 in Vecpiebalga. He graduated 1973 from the Art Academy of Latvia, Department of Sculpturing, and is a member of the Artists' Union of Latvia since 1978, and a member of the Latvian Designers' Society since 1994. He is also member of FIDEM, president of the Latvian Arts Medal Club and honorary member of the Latvian Academy of Science.

Works 

Strupulis has, in cooperation with Gunārs Lūsis, designed a number of Latvian coins with denominations in Lats dated 1992, the bi-metallic 2 Lats coin dated 1999, variations of the 1 Lats coins dated 1999, 2001, and many others.

Strupulis has been actively exhibiting his works since 1971. His main works are in the fields of medals, coins, pictures and drawings, and they have been displayed in more than a dozen countries, at more than 50 museums. He has created commemorative plaques in Riga for a number of notable persons, like: Ernst von Bergmann (2011), Johann Christoph Brotze (1996), as well as Ernests Brastiņš (2007, painter, 1892–1942), Herberts Tīmers (2006, architect, 1897–1938), Christoph Haberland (1994) and Aleksandrs Tīpainis (2006, postal official (1886–1974).

Prizes and awards 
 1986, 1989 Baltic Triennial Medal Art Prize
 1997 Pauls Stradiņš Prize
 1992, 1996 Dante Biennale Gold Medal
 1995 Baltic Triennial Medal Art Award

References 

1949 births
Living people
People from Cēsis Municipality
Latvian sculptors
Latvian artists
20th-century Latvian artists